Sir Andrew Halliday, KH (also spelt Hallidie; 17 March 1782 in Copewood, parish of Dryfesdale, Dumfries – 7 September 1839 in Dumfries) was a Scottish physician, reformer, and writer.

Biography
He was born in Copeland, Dryfesdale in Dumfriesshire.

When he was nine years old, Halliday had to earn his own living by tending cattle because of his father's financial problems. He later advanced himself by qualifying as a schoolteacher. Halliday subsequently entered the University of Edinburgh and started training for the Presbyterian ministry, but switched to medicine, his preference. He graduated with an MD on 24 June 1806 from the University of Edinburgh with a thesis entitled  that he later published as a book. After travelling in Russia, he set up in practice at Halesowen, Shropshire.

In 1807, he became a surgeon in the 13th Light Dragoons. Whilst in the British Army, Halliday served in the Napoleonic Wars in Portugal, Spain, and the West Indies, at the Siege of Bergen op Zoom (1814) and the Battle of Waterloo.

He was later the domestic physician to the Duke of Clarence and St Andrews (who became William IV), and traveled on the continent with him. In 1817, he was made a licentiate of the Royal College of Physicians of Edinburgh and, in 1819, of the Royal College of Physicians, London. While traveling on the continent, he became familiar with the medical applications of iodine, introducing it to Britain upon his return in 1819 and publishing an article on it in 1821. He was appointed a Knight of the Royal Guelphic Order in 1820 and a Knight Bachelor in 1821. In August 1827 he was elected a fellow of the Royal College of Physicians of Edinburgh. In 1829, he helped to establish King's College London. He also served as the majesty's justice of the peace for the county of Middlesex.

He was appointed Deputy Inspector-General of hospitals in the West Indies in 1832, but returned to his native Dumfries in 1837 because of ill health. He died at Huntingdon Lodge in Dumfries on 7 September 1839.

Halliday was the first physician to the Seamen's Hospital Society, which was established in 1821 with the purpose of helping people currently or previously employed in the Merchant Navy or fishing fleets. Halliday was the royal physician to William IV and to Queen Victoria. Before and after his military service he publicized the deplorable state of British and Irish insane asylums. He wrote Annals of the house of Hanover and The West Indies: the Nature and Physical History of the Windward and Leeward Colonies, published in 1826 and 1837, respectively.

His nephew, Andrew Smith Hallidie, promoted the Clay Street Hill Railroad in San Francisco, the world's first practical cable car system.

Bibliography

Halliday also contributed obituaries to The Gentleman's Magazine.

References

External sources
 Shows a picture and a description of Sir Andrew Halliday's coat of arms.

1781 births
1839 deaths
19th-century Scottish medical doctors
19th-century Scottish writers
British Army personnel of the Napoleonic Wars
People from Dumfries
Alumni of the University of Edinburgh